Brezici may refer to:

 Brezici (Derventa), a village in Bosnia and Herzegovina
 Brezici (Maglaj), a village in Bosnia and Herzegovina